Alavi Kola-ye Mir (also Romanized as ‘Alāvī Kolā-ye Mīr; also known as ‘Alāvī Kolā and ‘Alavī Kolā) is a village in Dabuy-ye Shomali Rural District, Sorkhrud District, Mahmudabad County, Mazandaran Province, Iran. At the 2006 census, its population was 719, in 182 families.

References 

Populated places in Mahmudabad County